The 2009 Illinois Fighting Illini football team represented the University of Illinois during the 2009 NCAA Division I FBS football season. The team's head football coach was Ron Zook. The Illini played their home games at Memorial Stadium in Champaign, Illinois. This was Ron Zook's fifth season as the Illini head coach. The Illini finished the season 3–9 (2–6 Big Ten). The Illini failed to live up to the lofty preseason expectations, receiving almost enough votes in the AP Poll to be ranked (and were said to be the unofficial #26 ranked team in the AP Poll because of this), and even were considered a dark horse candidate for the Big Ten championship. But after their blowout loss to Missouri, they failed to receive any votes, and failed to show any improvement until the Michigan State game, which followed blowout losses to Penn State and Ohio State, but by late in the season, they were able to upset Michigan and Minnesota while also giving Cincinnati a game.

Schedule

References

Illinois
Illinois Fighting Illini football seasons
Illinois Fighting Illini football